Mylabris ceylonica, is a species of blister beetle endemic to Sri Lanka.

Description
Body length is about 8 to 17 mm. Head is 1.2 to 2.6 mm long with coarse moderate deep and dense punctures. Pronotum is about 1.4 to 2.6 mm long. Pronotum strongly convergent from apical third to apex. Elytra elongate with moderately coarse shallow and dense punctures. Pubescence short and very dense on black area, but sparse on basal yellow part. Basal region of the elytra possess a trilobed black band. Elytra without a black dot in basal band. Ventrum moderately coarsely punctured and shiny. Male has feebly emarginate pygidium.

Adults are commonly found during March and June.

References 

Meloidae
Insects of Sri Lanka
Beetles described in 1782